Dilip Barua (born 28 February 1949) is a Bangladeshi politician. He is the general secretary of the Bangladesher Samyabadi Dal (Marksbadi-Leninbadi) ('Communist Party of Bangladesh (Marxist–Leninist)'). In January 2009, Barua was named Minister of Industries in the cabinet of Sheikh Hasina.

Early life and education
Barua was born on 28 February 1949. He completed his BSc (honours) in physics, MSc from the Dhaka University. He obtained MA, Diploma in journalism and LLB from the same university.

Career
Barua was a leader of the East Pakistan Students Union from 1966 to 1970. He was a member of the Communist Party since 1969 and elected member of the Dhaka City Committee of the Party in 1972. He was the President of the Jubo Federation during 1977–1979.

Barua is one of the architects of 14-party alliance. He played a vital role in the formulation of 31-point reforms of caretaker government and 23-points programs.

During his long political career, he was imprisoned in 1969 as the student leader, in 1983 as a member of the Political Bureau. He led an underground life for several times due to political reasons.

References

Living people
1949 births
Bangladeshi communists
Bangladeshi Buddhists
University of Dhaka alumni
Industries ministers of Bangladesh